Uche Ewah Azikiwe  , (born 4 February 1947) is a Nigerian academic, educator and author. She is the widow of former President of Nigeria Nnamdi Azikiwe. She is a professor in the Department of Educational Foundation, Faculty of Education at University of Nigeria, Nsukka. In 1999, she was appointed to the board of directors of the Central Bank of Nigeria(CBN).

Early life and education
Azikiwe was born on 4 February 1947 in Afikpo in present-day Ebonyi State. She was born to Sergeant Major Lawrence A. and Florence Ewah.

Azikiwe graduated with a Bachelor of Arts degree in English from the University of Nigeria, Nsukka (UNN). She then proceeded to obtain a master's degree in Curriculum Studies and Sociology of Education. In 1992, she obtained a Ph.D. in Sociology of Education/Gender Studies from the same university.

Academic career
From 1981 to 1987, Azikiwe worked as a teacher at Nsukka High School. She moved to the Department of Educational Foundation, Faculty of Education, University of Nigeria, Nsukka in 1987.

Affiliations
Azikiwe is a member of a number of professional societies and associations including, World Council for Curriculum and Instruction (WCCI), Network for Women Studies in Nigeria (NWSN), Curriculum Organization of Nigeria (CON), National Women Studies Association (NWSA), USA and Nigeria Association of University Women (NAUW).

Personal life
She married Nnamdi Azikiwe at age 26, and had two children, Uwakwe Ukuta and Molokwu Azubuike.

See also
List of people from Ebonyi State

References

External links
Uche Azikiwe profile at Bloomberg

1947 births
People from Ebonyi State
Living people
Members of the Order of the Federal Republic
University of Nigeria alumni
Academic staff of the University of Nigeria
Writers from Ebonyi State
Uche
Nigerian women academics
Nigerian sociologists
Women sociologists
Nigerian government officials
Igbo people